Georg Großmann (born 2 April 1940) is a German bobsledder. He competed in the two man event at the 1980 Winter Olympics.

References

External links
 

1940 births
Living people
German male bobsledders
Olympic bobsledders of West Germany
Bobsledders at the 1980 Winter Olympics
People from Bad Säckingen
Sportspeople from Freiburg (region)